Berne (English: [bɜːn]) is a city within Monroe and Wabash townships, Adams County, Indiana, United States, located  south of Fort Wayne. The population was 4,173 at the 2020 Census. Berne is widely known for its Swiss heritage, architecture and culture, and for its status as the "Furniture Capital of Indiana." Bloomberg Businessweek rated Berne the 2nd "Best Place to Raise Your Kids" in Indiana in 2011.

Berne and the surrounding area have also become known for their large Amish population (the 5th largest Amish community in the USA), who speak Bernese German (a Swiss German dialect), as opposed to Pennsylvania Dutch.
Home of Amish Country Popcorn, established in 1978 by Brian Lehman. Harvests roughly 10 million pounds of popcorn per year and sells across the globe.

History
Berne was settled in 1852 by Mennonite immigrants who came directly from Switzerland (Münsterberg, in the Jura Mountains near Moutier) and named the community after their homeland's capital. They began the chore of preparing for farming by clearing the land. However, farm markets were severely limited because of treacherous mud roads and distant trade centers. The advent of the railroad was soon to be the answer to the immigrants' prayers.

When the Grand Rapids and Indiana Railroad laid plans to construct a rail line through Adams County, two farmers, John Hilty and Abraham Lehman, offered a proposition; they would donate land to the railroad in exchange for the building of a rail depot in the small community. The deed indicates that Abraham Lehman and Christian Leichty were the parties who donated the land for the depot. The railroad companies agreed, and Hilty and Lehman (as recorded on the original plat map of Berne on file at the Adams County, Indiana, records office) quickly platted ten building lots in anticipation of what was to come - more settlers. The lots were located in Wabash Township along an east to west road later named Main Street. On Christmas Day, 1871, the first train arrived at the local depot. This historical event marked the beginning of Berne, which was officially recorded as a community soon after. A post office was established in Berne in 1872.

A steady stream of Swiss and German people came into the area from that train, as did English-speaking migrants, some of whom became successful businessmen in the new community. They contributed immensely in the growth of Berne. After the population of the town exceeded 2,500, on a petition of two-thirds of the residents, the town decided to become a city in 1887. By 1895 the community was the second largest city in the county with an entrepreneurial business spirit and community activities revolving around many different church and social groups.

The General Conference of the Mennonite Church has been held in Berne four times - the first in 1884, the last in 1947. The First Mennonite Church in Berne is the largest of its kind in North America, and previously had the largest congregation. It is affiliated with the Lancaster Mennonite Conference.

Geography
Berne is located in northeastern Indiana at  (40.658146, -84.954256).

Teays River 
An ancient pre-glacial river known as the "Teays River" (about the size of the Ohio River) with its headwaters near present-day Blowing Rock, North Carolina, used to pass through Virginia, West Virginia and Ohio and run just east of Berne (with its western edge passing near the intersection of 000 Road with State Road 218) before flowing southwest through the present town of Geneva into Jay County. It then continued its course across Indiana into Illinois, draining most of the east-central United States. The glaciers of the last Ice Age (the Pleistocene) bisected the Teays River Valley and buried it underneath at least 400 feet of glacial drift (the largest remaining piece is the Kanawha River of West Virginia). Although the river does not flow anymore, the underground Teays River Valley still contains significant water deposits, making Berne and Geneva very water-rich areas. In fact, wells just to the east of Berne provide the much larger city of Decatur (c.10 miles north) with a large proportion of its water supply. The current locations of many wetland areas - such as Limberlost Swamp Nature Preserve, Loblolly Marsh Nature Preserve, Limberlost Park and Rainbow Bend Park lie over the old Teays River Valley.

Demographics

2010 census
As of the census of 2010, there were 3,999 people, 1,620 households, and 1,078 families residing in the city. The racial makeup of the city was 96.5% White, 0.5% African American, 0.1% Native American, 0.6% Asian, 1.4% from other races, and 1.0% from two or more races. Hispanic or Latino of any race were 4.0% of the population.

There were 1,620 households, out of which 29.3% had children under the age of 18 living with them, 53.4% were married couples living together, 9.9% had a female householder with no husband present, 3.3% had a male householder with no wife present, and 33.5% were non-families. 31.3% of all households were made up of individuals, and 17.5% had someone living alone who was 65 years of age or older. The average household size was 2.35 and the average family size was 2.94.

The median age in the city was 42 years. 24.1% of residents were under the age of 18; 7% were between the ages of 18 and 24; 22.4% were from 25 to 44; 22.6% were from 45 to 64; and 24% were 65 years of age or older. The gender makeup of the city was 46.1% male and 53.9% female.

2000 census
As of the 2000 census, there were 4,150 people, 1,639 households, and 1,104 families residing in the city. The racial makeup of the city was 97.64% White, 0.07% African American, 0.07% Native American, 0.22% Asian, 0.05% Pacific Islander, 1.04% from other races, and 0.92% from two or more races. Hispanic or Latino of any race were 1.90% of the population.

There were 1,639 households, out of which 32.0% had children under the age of 18 living with them, 57.5% were married couples living together, 7.7% had a female householder with no husband present, and 32.6% were non-families. 31.4% of all households were made up of individuals, and 18.9% had someone living alone who was 65 years of age or older. The average household size was 2.40 and the average family size was 3.02.

In the city, the population was spread out, with 25.7% under the age of 18, 6.8% from 18 to 24, 24.3% from 25 to 44, 19.3% from 45 to 64, and 23.8% who were 65 years of age or older. The median age was 40 years. For every 100 females, there were 86.5 males. For every 100 females aged 18 and over, there were 80.5 males.

The median income for a household in the city was $35,491, and the median income for a family was $45,670. Males had a median income of $31,565 versus $21,563 for females. The per capita income for the city was $17,394. About 1.4% of families and 3.6% of the population were below the poverty line, including 2.5% of those under age 18 and 6.1% of those age 65 or over.

Economy

Furniture Manufacturing

Gehrig Furniture (1877-1905) 
Ulrich Gehrig (1825-1898), an 1852 Mennonite immigrant from Switzerland, opened the first furniture store in Berne in 1877, which was then carried on by his son Louis Gehrig (1870-1927) until 1905, "both of whom manufactured considerable of the furniture which they sold." Ulrich had previously been drafted during the American Civil War, serving as a Private in Co. I, 12th Indiana Infantry Regiment (December 1, 1864 - July 6, 1865). The Gehrig Furniture store was located on the southeast corner of Water & Behring Streets.

Dunbar Furniture Manufacturing Company (1919-1993) 
Berne's national reputation for furniture manufacturing began with Leander Dunbar (1850-1934), a native of the Linn Grove area of Adams County. By 1882 Dunbar had left his father's farm to be a wagon and buggy-maker in Linn Grove. Following the invention of the automobile and Henry Ford's assembly line, Dunbar saw the writing on the wall and transitioned into furniture making (by 1916). Finally, in April 1919 the "Dunbar Furniture Manufacturing Company" was incorporated with a capital investment of $25,000 and Leander Dunbar and Homer Niederhauser (1886-1973) - also a Linn Grove native - as directors. It consisted of 23 employees working in a single room factory, with sales of $8,000 that first year. Within a few months (October 1919), Dunbar moved its headquarters to Berne to take advantage of its railroad line and highways. Within seven years (1926), Dunbar was operating a 36,000 sq. ft. facility with sales of $1.5 million - the largest upholstery plant in Indiana and the 4th largest in output in the country.

By 1931 Niederhauser had taken over as president and was actively searching for a designer to update their line of furniture. He found one in Edward J. Wormley, who just happened to be job-hunting at the time due to the Depression (and who would become one of the top modernist designers of the century). Wormley accepted and began designing furniture that made the Dunbar company internationally famous. At its height, Dunbar furniture made in Berne was in government buildings and embassies, museums, and on the Tonight Show Starring Johnny Carson (the conical swivel chairs). As a mark of its popularity, the critically acclaimed TV show Mad Men (set in the 1960s) references Dunbar furniture in Season 3, Episode 7 ("Seven Twenty-Three" at about the 2:23 mark). Wormley continued to design furniture for Dunbar until his retirement in 1968. Following his retirement and the sale of the company to new owners, Dunbar fell on hard times, eventually ceasing operations in 1993. However, it had inspired and spawned a series of new furniture companies in Berne before it folded. Antique Dunbar furniture continues to be highly sought after today.

(In 2002 the company's intellectual property was bought by a new corporation in North Carolina - DUNBAR Furniture, LLC - which has revived a few of Wormley's designs).

Berne Furniture Company (1925-2008) 
Berne Furniture Company was incorporated on June 12, 1925, by Lawrence L. Yager, with Yager as the first President, Noah Luginbill as Secretary-Treasurer, and Alvin Neuenschwander as Business Manager. That first year they had 15 employees. By 1951 total annual sales exceeded $950,000. After several decades of success as family-owned, mid-priced furniture manufacturer, with a workforce that reached 125, Berne Furniture Company closed its doors in 2008.

Smith Brothers of Berne, Inc. (1926-Present) 
Homer Manufacturing Company was incorporated on November 22, 1926, with Homer Niederhauser (1886-1973) as its first President (he was also President of Dunbar Furniture). "It began as a manufacturer of lower price point chairs to supplement the high-end furniture being produced by Dunbar in Berne." This chair factory was located in a 12,000 sq. ft. facility. After the company was purchased by brothers Orva "Orv" N. Smith (1890-1961) and Leslie "Les" B. Smith (1899-1969) in 1936, they renamed it  Smith Brothers Furniture Manufacturing Company (November 23, 1936) and expanded its production into higher-end custom furniture. By 1951 total annual sales reached $1,000,000. When the Smith Brothers retired in 1960, they sold the company to Les' son-in-law, Carl Muselman and his brother Arthur "Art" Muselman. The Muselmans kept the company name but simplified it to Smith Brothers of Berne, Inc. as of January 16, 1967. Due to Smith Brothers running into difficulty in the late 1960s, the Muselman brothers brought in Fred A. Lehman as president in 1970 with a 50% ownership interest. Fred helped lead the company back to prosperity before stepping back in the mid-1980s to have his younger brother Steve W. Lehman take over as president. Smith Brothers currently employs over 525 people in a roughly 500,000 sq. ft. facility in Berne, producing over 2,100 upholstered pieces a week, with its products sold in over 30 states and Canada. For continuing to manufacture its furniture in Berne, Indiana, instead of outsourcing its manufacturing to other countries, Smith Brothers was recognized with an appearance on the Discovery Channel show In View with Larry King in 2014. Smith Brothers is the only remaining company of the original "Big Three" furniture manufacturers in Berne.

Local Businesses 

In terms of furniture stores, the city of Berne has the following:

 Yager Furniture, Inc. (1910–Present) - Around 1883 Joel and Daniel Welty opened the "Welty Brothers" Furniture store in Berne. This business was sold several times between 1890 and 1910, finally landing in the hands of Eli C. Bierie and Lawrence L. Yager in 1910. These two men formally incorporated the business as "Bierie & Yager, Inc." on February 2, 1931. It was later renamed "Yager Furniture Company, Inc." on December 9, 1937. It remains family-owned to this day.
 Habegger Furniture, Inc. (1938–Present) - The four Habegger brothers (Sylvan, Clinton, Arley - "Pete" and Milo - "Mike") incorporated "Habegger Furniture, Inc." on May 26, 1938, and opened their US-27 / High Street location on August 25 of that same year, where the store has remained ever since. Their business started as a small re-upholstery shop in a two-car garage. It remains family-owned to this day and offers a large selection of local Smith Brothers furniture.
 Clauser Furniture, Inc. (1949–Present) - Alfred E. "Tuck" Clauser (who worked at Dunbar for 25 years) and his friend Hobart "Hobie" Myers opened "Clauser & Myers Furniture" on Labor Day, 1949. Following Myers' untimely death in 1952, Clauser bought his share of the business, which was formally incorporated as "Clauser Furniture, Inc." on January 26, 1970. It remains family-owned to this day.
 Bernhaus Furniture, Inc. (2003–Present) - Bob and Madelyn Wurster (née Clauser), along with sons Curt and Brad, incorporated "Berne Home Furnishings, Inc." on March 21, 2003. Shortly thereafter, the name was changed to "Bernhaus Furniture, Inc." They opened at their current location on US-27 in November 2003.

Outside of furniture, the city of Berne is home to many additional local businesses. These include:

 Affolder Implement Sales, Inc. - tractor, farm and construction equipment dealer (since 1930).
 Berne Ready Mix - producer of concrete, hard building supplies and precast products.
 DRG, Inc. - having two main divisions: Annie's Publishing - based in Berne, and Strategic Fulfillment Group (SFG) - located in Big Sandy, TX.
 Edelweiss, Inc. - florist.
 E.P. Graphics, Inc. - commercial printer. Family-owned since 1925.
 FCC (Adams), LLC - a manufacturer of automatic transmission clutches. It is a subsidiary of the Japanese company, FCC Co. Ltd., and serves automotive customers such as Honda, Suzuki, Yamaha, Kawasaki Heavy Industries, Honda R&D Co. and Ford.
 Fear Powersports, LLC - off-road vehicle dealership. 
 First Bank of Berne - locally owned and operated community bank, founded in 1891.
 Habegger's Ace Hardware - hardware store that has been family-owned since 1956 (formerly "Habegger Building & Supply").
 Key Fastener's Corporation - manufacturer of fasteners for the automotive industry.
 Micromatic LLC - a designer and manufacturer of rotary actuators and automated assembly equipment.
 Moser Motor Sales Inc. - founded in 1904, a family-owned Ford dealership since 1914 - the oldest in Indiana.
 Poseidon Barge, Ltd. - a global supplier of portable sectional barges. 
The "Berne Overall & Shirt Company," formed in 1915 by E.T. Haecker and his son Vilas Haecker, was later renamed "Berne Apparel Company" and moved to New Haven, and then Ossian in 2010. It pays homage to its legacy by continuing to use the Berne name and bear logo on its products (durable workwear).

Government 
Gregg A. Sprunger has served as Mayor of the City of Berne since 2020.

Along with an elected Mayor, the city of Berne elects a Clerk-Treasurer and a City Council. The City Council is composed of five members, four elected from established districts and one at-large member.

Berne Mayors:
 Gregg Sprunger (R) (2020-)
 Bill McKean (R) (2012-2020)
 John Minch (D) (2004-2012)
 Blaine Fulton (R) (1992-2004)
Delmar Neuenschwander (D) (1984-1992)
 Gaylord Stuckey (D) (1976-1984)
 Willard "Bill" Wulliman (R) (1968-1976)
 Richard Lehman (D) (1964-1968)
 Forrest Balsiger (D) (1952-1964)
 Andrew Sprunger (D) (1950-1952)

Education

Public 
K-12 public education in Berne is provided by South Adams Schools. South Adams Jr./Sr. High School shares its building with the Elementary and Middle Schools. Their mascot is the "Starfire."

Four area schools (former rivals) consolidated into "South Adams" just prior to the 1966–67 school year. They were the "Berne Bears", the "Geneva Cardinals", the "Hartford Gorillas", and the "Jefferson Warriors." Though the consolidated school was located in Berne, as a compromise the school took a new name and mascot - "The South Adams Starfires" - ostensibly named after the first principal/superintendent's car (an "Oldsmobile Starfire").

Library
The Berne Public Library, which opened its doors in 1935 and is currently located in the former city auditorium, serves the city of Berne. The library provides information services to all ages and holds over 60,000 titles, including print, digital, audio, and visual forms. The Heritage Room of the Berne Public Library contains local history and genealogical information.

Culture

Swiss Days Celebration 
The annual Swiss Days Celebration in Berne is held the last Friday and Saturday in July and attracts thousands of visitors every year as locals celebrate their Swiss and American culture. Main Street is closed downtown as numerous vendors, food trucks and carnival rides set up shop. A large tent and stage are constructed for live music (of many genres, including polka). Events include an antique tractor and engine show, car show, horse pull, quilt show, competitive "stein toss" (stone throw), and the popular annual "Swiss Days Race" (5K for adults, 1 mile for children), held every year since 1972 (except 2020 - Covid). The schedule of events can be found on the Swiss Days website, sponsored by the Berne Chamber of Commerce.

Das Märit Farmers' & Artists' Market 
Local produce and art are sold at "Das Märit" market every Saturday from mid-May until early October. The market is located in the First Mennonite Church parking lot in Berne.

City parks

Muensterberg Plaza and Clock Tower 
The idea of building the clock tower and plaza was first raised in 2001 while the city of Berne was planning for its sesquicentennial. Wanting to celebrate the city's Swiss heritage, it was decided to model the clock tower after the medieval Zytglogge in Bern, Switzerland, the oldest monument in that city (built c. 1220, repaired in 1405). The clock tower and plaza were given the name Muensterberg (Münsterberg) after the small Mennonite community in the Jura Mountains of Switzerland that Berne's first immigrants came from. After several years of careful planning and fundraising, the clock tower was constructed in 2010. It stands 160 feet tall and 32 feet wide, weighing approximately 1,216 tons (over 2.4 million pounds). It contains carillon bells created by the Verdin Company, which ring on the hour. Local enthusiasm for the project reached its peak during the summer of 2012 when the splash pad was first made operational in the center of the plaza.  As early as the summer of 2009, however, several residents were heard to publicly declare their admiration for and dedication to the clock tower, and soon afterward the Clock Tower Enthusiasts Club was formed.

In addition to the splash pad, the Muensterberg Plaza built around the clock tower also features The Settler's Statue commemorating the arrival of the first settlers to the area, the only stateside Canton Tree, and a series of flowerbeds laid out to resemble common quilting patterns.

Lehman Park 
Lehman Park is a wooded 11.5-acre park located at the intersection of US 27 and Park Avenue. The land for the park was donated to the city of Berne by Isaac and Caroline Lehman in 1928. The park contains a rentable indoor pavilion with restrooms and electricity, two playground areas, sand volleyball court, two baseball diamonds, and an asphalt basketball court, along with picnic tables and grilling areas.

Media 
Berne is served by one tri-weekly newspaper, The Berne Witness (published every Monday, Wednesday, and Friday). The paper was founded in 1896 by Swiss immigrant Fred Rohrer (1867-1936). At one time both German and English editions were offered; the former was later discontinued.

Berne, along with the rest of Adams County, is served by WZBD 92.7 FM - Adams County Radio.

Notable people
 Mary Butcher - All-American Girls Professional Baseball League player.
 The Dilley sextuplets - the USA's first surviving sextuplets.
 Bob Dro (Berne HS '37) - played basketball and baseball for Indiana University; starter on IU's 1940 NCAA Championship squad; played minor league baseball for the Grand Rapid Colts (Brooklyn Dodgers organization) and basketball for the NBL's Indianapolis Kautskys. From 1957 to 1976, he was Assistant and then Associate Athletic Director at Indiana University. He was inducted into the Indiana Basketball Hall of Fame in 1978.
 Arthur L. Gilliom - 25th Indiana Attorney General (1925-1929), involved in breaking the Second Ku Klux Klan in Indiana (battling D.C. Stephenson) as well as enforcement of Prohibition. Raised on a farm off of State Road 218 (formally 118) east of Berne from age 4 to 20 (1890-1907). Attended local district primary schools. Raised Mennonite, he studied "Oratory" at Goshen College (1907-1910), before attending the University of Michigan Law School (1910-1913), after which he set up his legal practice in South Bend, Indiana. His parents and many siblings are buried in the Mennonite Cemetery in Berne.
 Les Habegger (Berne HS '43) - former General Manager of the NBA's Seattle SuperSonics (1983–85); prior to that was Assistant Coach during their 1979 NBA Championship season. From 1957 to 1974 he head-coached the Seattle Pacific University Basketball team. He was inducted into the Indiana Basketball Hall of Fame in 2014.
 Ervin Inniger (Berne HS '63) - member of Indiana University's 1967 Big Ten Championship basketball team; played for the ABA's Minnesota Muskies and Miami Floridians; all-time winningest coach for the North Dakota State University Men's Basketball team (1978–92).
 Peter Luginbill - early founder and settler of Berne.
 Donald Neuen (Berne HS '52) - former Professor and Director of Choral Conducting & Choral Studies at UCLA's Herb Alpert School of Music.
 Dr. Richard R. Schrock - (born in Berne in 1945). Winner of the 2005 Nobel Prize in Chemistry for his work in the area of olefin metathesis, an organic synthesis technique. Formerly Professor of Chemistry at MIT (1975-2018) and currently the Distinguished Professor of Chemistry at the University of California, Riverside. Son of Noah J. Schrock (1911-1980) and Martha A. Habegger (1913-2008).
 Jerome "Jerry" Steiner (Berne HS '36) - played basketball at Butler University for Tony Hinkle where he held the All-Time Scoring Record and was Team Captain his Senior Year (1940) when he was named Butler's 3rd All-American. Played professional basketball for the Indianapolis Kautskys, and the Fort Wayne Zollner Pistons. Inducted into the Butler University Hall of Fame (1993) and Indiana Basketball Hall of Fame (1982).
 Dr. Ernie Steury (Berne HS '48) - missionary doctor who established the Tenwek Hospital in Kenya.

References

External links
 City website
 Berne Chamber of Commerce
 Muensterberg Plaza and Clock Tower
 Pine Lake Waterpark
 Swiss Heritage Society
 Berne Public Library
 Swiss American Historical Society
 Adams Memorial Hospital
 Ceylon Covered Bridge

Cities in Indiana
Cities in Adams County, Indiana
Populated places established in 1852
Swiss-American culture in Indiana
1852 establishments in Indiana